In the context of the late Russian Empire, a mayovka was a picnic in the countryside or in a park in the early days of May.  Eventually, "mayovka" came to mean an illegal celebration of May 1 by revolutionary dissidents, typically presented as an innocent picnic. After the revolution, this proletarian mayovka merged into Labour Day.

References

Russian Empire
May observances
May Day protests
Russian words and phrases